Dahris Butterworth Martin (November 17, 1900 – July 1980) was an American writer, from Vermont in the United States, the daughter of John D. Martin and [missing first name] Martin, née Butterworth.  Her family origins lay in Maghera, County Londonderry, Ireland. She is best known for her 1937 travel book on Tunisia, Among the Faithful. Martin was born in New York state and studied at Columbia University. She worked for a while at the publishing house Doubleday. In 1925, she left for Europe and lived in France and Switzerland. In 1926, she moved to Tunisia where she met her future husband Harry Shokler (1896-1978), an American artist and print-maker.

Martin's most famous book Among the Faithful was first published in London in 1937, in New York in 1943 as "I Know Tunisia" and is still in print. Her children's books include:

 Adventure in Ireland
 Adventure in Tunisia: The Fair at Kairwan
 Awisha's Carpet
 Fatma Was a Goose
 Little Lamb
 The Wonder Cat

References

 

1900 births
1980 deaths
American travel writers
American children's writers
Columbia University alumni
Place of birth missing
Place of death missing
Date of death unknown
American women travel writers